Aapeli Richard "Riku" Korhonen (29 March 1883 – 7 January 1932) was a Finnish gymnast, who competed at the 1908 Summer Olympics.

He was part of the Viipurin Reipas team that won the gymnastics Finnish national championship in 1906. He was nominated into the club's honorary legion.

He was the father of Urho Korhonen, who competed in gymnastics at the 1928 Summer Olympics.

He died of cardiac arrest.

References 

Finnish male artistic gymnasts
Olympic gymnasts of Finland
Gymnasts at the 1908 Summer Olympics
1883 births
1932 deaths
People from Viipuri Province (Grand Duchy of Finland)
20th-century Finnish people